Finland women's national under-17 football team is the football team representing Finland in competitions for under-17 year old players and is controlled by the Finnish Football Association. The team qualified for the first time ever at the 2018 FIFA U-17 Women's World Cup in Uruguay.

Competitive record

FIFA U-17 Women's World Cup 
Due to their third place during the 2018 UEFA Women's Under-17 Championship, Finland had also qualified for the 2018 FIFA U-17 Women's World Cup.

UEFA Women's Under-17 Championship 
The team finished third in the 2018 UEFA Women's Under-17 Championship.

See also

 Finland women's national football team
 Finland women's national under-20 football team
 Women's association football around the world
 Finland men's national football team

References

under-17
Women's national under-17 association football teams